Tosapusia duplex is a species of sea snail, a marine gastropod mollusk, in the family Costellariidae, the ribbed miters.

Distribution
This species occurs in the following locations:
 Indonesia
 Papua New Guinea (Type locality)
 Solomon Islands
 South China Sea

References

 Cernohorsky W.O. (1982 ["1981"]). On a collection of buccinacean and mitracean gastropods (Mollusca, Neogastropoda) from the Mozambique Channel and New Caledonia. Bulletin du Muséum National d'Histoire Naturelle, Paris. ser. 4, section A, 3(4): 985-1009.
 Lan T.C. (2004). A new Vexillum in the family Costellariidae from the South China Sea. Bulletin of Malacology, Taiwan, 28: 5-8

External links
 Schepman M.M. (1911) The Prosobranchia of the Siboga Expedition. Part IV. Rachiglossa. Siboga-Expeditie, 49d: 247-363, pls. 18–24. Leiden, E.J. Brill

Costellariidae
Gastropods described in 1982